Stanley Nelson Lundine (born February 4, 1939) is an American politician from Jamestown, New York who served as Mayor of Jamestown, a United States representative, and Lieutenant Governor of New York.

Life and career

Lundine graduated from Duke University in 1961 and from the New York University School of Law in 1964.

A Democrat, Lundine served as Mayor of Jamestown, New York from 1970 until 1976, when he was elected to the U.S. House of Representatives.

While mayor, Jamestown received national attention as a result of his Labor Management strategy. Jamestown, long the center of labor strife, became a model for labor/management co-operation.  As a Congressman, Lundine brought his labor/management ideas to Washington, and was instrumental in developing legislation that created labor/management councils and employee stock ownership plans. He focused on finance, banking and economic development policy, and also served on the Science Committee.  He was a subcommittee chairman on the House Banking Committee.

Lundine is the only Democrat to have represented the Western Southern Tier in Congress in the 20th century, and no other Democrats would do so until Democrats Brian Higgins and Eric Massa won both portions of the now-divided district in 2005 and 2009 respectively.

In 1986, Lundine declined to seek reelection to Congress. Instead, he ran for and was elected to be the Lieutenant Governor of New York, running alongside Mario Cuomo, who became governor in 1986. They were re-elected in 1990.

In 1994, Cuomo and Lundine were defeated for reelection by George Pataki and Betsy McCaughey Ross.

Sources

 Paterson, David "Black, Blind, & In Charge: A Story of Visionary Leadership and Overcoming Adversity."Skyhorse Publishing. New York, New York, 2020

1939 births
Living people
Mayors of places in New York (state)
Politicians from Jamestown, New York
Lieutenant Governors of New York (state)
1992 United States presidential electors
Duke University alumni
New York University School of Law alumni
Democratic Party members of the United States House of Representatives from New York (state)